James Anderson Gardner  (October 4, 1874 – April 24, 1905) was a professional baseball player. He was a pitcher for the Pittsburgh Pirates and Chicago Orphans of the National League between 1895 and 1902.

References

1874 births
1905 deaths
Major League Baseball pitchers
Baseball players from Pennsylvania
Pittsburgh Pirates players
Chicago Orphans players
19th-century baseball players
Worcester Farmers players
Indianapolis Hoosiers (minor league) players
Hartford Indians players
Wooden Nutmegs players
Columbus Senators players
Toronto Maple Leafs (International League) players
Toronto Maple Leafs (International League) managers
Burials at Homewood Cemetery